Group 18 is the name of a junior rugby league competition on the far north coast of New South Wales, Australia.  Currently, the group has no senior competition.  Prior to 2005, there was a joint Gold Coast-Group 18 competition which fielded teams from both the Queensland and New South Wales sides of the border.  With the Burleigh Bears joining the Queensland Cup in 1997 and the Tweed Heads Seagulls joining them in 2003, the combined competition started to lose some of its lustre.  In 2005, it was dissolved with the remaining Queensland teams forming a dedicated Gold Coast competition and the NSW teams joining an expanded Group 1 competition, now named Northern Rivers Regional Rugby League.  Both Group 1 and Group 18 run junior competitions.

Seniors 

The Group 18 Senior Rugby League Premiership amalgamated with Group 1 Rugby League in 2005 to form the Northern Rivers Regional Rugby League, and was thus discontinued in its own right.

Current Clubs 
In the 2020 season, there are 119 teams participating through the age groups of U6's to U16.5's. In the U16's, the following club have teams participating in the competition:

 Bilambil Jets
 Cudgen Hornets
 Murwillumbah Colts
 Mullumbimby Giants
 South Tweed Bears
 Tugun Seahawks
 Tweed Coast/Cabarita Raiders
 Tweed Heads Seagulls
 Byron Bay-Lennox Head Red Devil Dolphins (combined team of the former Byron Bay Red Devils and the Lennox Head Dolphins)

Group 18 Grand Finals 
Group 18 Grand Finals (1968-1997 where available)

1969  Murwillumbah Brothers 11-0  Cudgen Headland

1970  Cudgen Headland       20-7  Tweed Heads Seagulls

1971  South Murwillumbah   21-10 Burleigh Heads

1972  Gold Coast            16-11 Tweed Heads Seagulls

1973  Tweed Heads Seagulls  45-5  Murwillumbah Brothers

1974  Tweed Heads Seagulls  16-8  Mullumbimby

1975  Tweed Heads Seagulls  12-11 South Murwillumbah

1976  Cudgen Headland       19-7  Tweed Heads Seagulls

1977  Tweed Heads Seagulls  47-0  South Murwillumbah

1978  Murwillumbah Old Boys 20-11 Tweed Heads Seagulls

1979  Murwillumbah Old Boys 16-5  Tweed Heads Seagulls

1980  Bilambil-Terranora Lakes 23-11 Murwillumbah Old Boys

1981  Byron Bay             13-19 Tweed Heads Seagulls

1982  Bilambil-Terranora Lakes
22-12 Tweed Heads Seagulls

1983  Tweed Heads Seagulls 30-1  Bilambil-Terranora Lakes
* Tweed Heads Seagulls also won the Clayton Cup.

1984  Tweed Heads Seagulls  35-18 Cudgen Headland

1985  ???

1986  ???

1987  South Tweed           20-18 Cudgen Headland

1988  Cudgen Headland        8-4  Tweed Heads Seagulls

1989  Tweed Heads Seagulls  36-16 Southport
* Tweed Heads Seagulls also won the Clayton Cup.

1990  Beaudesert            20-18 Bilambil-Terranora Lakes

1991  Beaudesert            32-18 Runaway Bay

1992  Bilambil-Terranora Lakes
24-0  Nerang

1993  Bilambil-Terranora Lakes
26-4  Beaudesert

1994  Tweed Heads Seagulls  27-26 Nerang

1995  Burleigh Heads        26-6  South Tweed

1996  South Tweed           16-10 Burleigh Heads

1997  Runaway Bay          18-17 Cudgen Headland

External links
 Group 18 on Country Rugby League's official site
 Group 18 Official Website

References 

Rugby league competitions in New South Wales
Sport in Tweed Heads, New South Wales
Northern Rivers
Recurring sporting events established in 1914
1914 establishments in Australia
Sports leagues established in 1914